Elroy Simon "Guck" Guckert  (May 17, 1900 – September 3, 1940) was an American football and basketball coach, college athletics administrator, and professor. He served as the head football coach at Hillsdale College in Hillsdale, Michigan from 1925 to 1926, compiling a record of 8–6–2. He was head basketball coach at Hillsdale for the 1925–26 season, tallying a mark of 5–9. Guckert was also Hilldale's athletic director and a professor of economics before leaving the school in February 1927 to attend Columbia University.

A native of Sandusky, Ohio, Guckert attended Denison University in Granville, Ohio, where he played football as a back and baseball as a first baseman. He coached football and basketball at Grand Rapids South High School in Grand Rapids, Michigan before succeeding fellow Denison alumnus Howard B. Jefferson as coach as Hillsdale in 1925.

Disappearance
Guckert is said to have died when he disappeared from a ship in 1940. However, his body was never recovered and he was never seen again, so his fate is unknown.

Head coaching record

College football

See also
List of people who disappeared mysteriously at sea

References

1900 births
1940 deaths
1940s missing person cases
Baseball players from Ohio
Basketball coaches from Ohio
Basketball players from Ohio
Baseball first basemen
Denison Big Red baseball players
Denison Big Red football players
Denison Big Red men's basketball players
Hillsdale Chargers athletic directors
Hillsdale Chargers football coaches
Hillsdale Chargers men's basketball coaches
Hillsdale College faculty
High school basketball coaches in Michigan
High school football coaches in Michigan
Sportspeople from Sandusky, Ohio
Coaches of American football from Ohio
Players of American football from Ohio